Mining accidents at the Markham Colliery at Staveley near Chesterfield, Derbyshire, England.

Accident in 1973 

On 30 July 1973, 18 coal miners lost their lives and a further 11 were seriously injured when a descending cage carrying the men failed to slow down as it approached the bottom of the mine shaft and 18 miners were killed by the impact. The accident was caused by fracture of the brake-rod, when a slowly growing fatigue crack reached a critical size and the brake-rod parted.

Following a thorough investigation it was found that metal fatigue failure occurred in the braking mechanism used to slow down the cage as it descended.

Accident investigation using fracture mechanics

Background
The main part of the set up is the winding motor which is driven by the dc motor. Two double deck cages are attached to the two ends of the winding rope. At the start of the winding cycle, power applied to winding motor is gradually increased and mechanical brake released. The cages accelerate then maintain a speed of  until the cages approach the ends of the shaft. During deceleration, generator voltage driving the winding motor is reduced to produce regenerative braking and it is finally brought to rest by a mechanical brake.

Mechanical brake consists of a pair of brake shoes applied to the underside of the brake paths by the action of the compressed spring nest operating through a system of levers. This vertical brake rod is always in tension as the springs are compressed. It also consists of a servospring mechanism which uses the compressed air to counteract the spring force to move the brake shoes away.

For the sake of safety there is an automatic controller which cut off the power supply to winder motor and applies mechanical brake. Also there is an emergency stop button which activates the ‘ungabbling gear’ which disengages brake control lever from Iversen type valve and applies mechanical brake.

Accident

On Monday, 30 July 1973 the winding engine man noticed some sparks under the brake cylinder when he started to retard the winding. He immediately increased regenerative braking and simultaneously pulled the brake lever to ON position. As there was no effect, he  pressed the emergency stop button. This too had no effect  and the cage crashed the bottom wooden landing baulks with enormous force which killed 18 and seriously injured 11 people.

Investigation

All electrical and mechanical components of the winding system were thoroughly investigated to find the cause of accident. Electrical systems were found to be working as supply of compressed air was available above the servo cylinder. However the brake shoes were about  clear of the brake paths as the vertical brake rod had broken into two pieces. So the investigation concentrated on the failure of the brake rod.

A chemical analysis proved that the material of the brake rod (carbon steel with the designation En8, conforming to British Standard 970:1947) was within the specification demanded at the time of manufacture.

Metallurgical examination of the brake rod showed that it failed because of fatigue. There were many secondary cracks around the fracture surface which were detected by magnetic   particle technique. To investigate fatigue failure it was necessary to determine the inservice loading of the brake rod.

The broken rod was replaced with a new rod and loading conditions were applied. Readings were taken during manual release and application of the brake and during emergency application of brake. The results showed that in addition to the expected direct tensile stresses at gauge positions there were substantial stresses due to bending when the brake was operated. The magnitude of stresses varied to such an extent that for the one farthest from the drum there was a change from tension to compression as the brake was released. The rod was not designed for such alternating bending loads. The rod was designed with a factor of safety 6.1 for tensile stress. But when alternative bending stress are induced, failure was inevitable.

It was also found that mild steel bearing pad surfaces were badly worn as lubrication was not effective at bearings. This was also due to the unexpected bending stress which progressively squeezed the lubricant out of the gap.

Follow up 

A National Committee for Safety of Manriding in Shafts and Unwalkable Outlets was formed and first met on 3 December 1973.  The Committee produced two reports and an addendum.    

The National Coal Board carried out a programme to examine the braking and safety systems on all of its mine winders and modified them in accordance with the recommendations of the reports.

Underground explosion in 1938 

An underground explosion in 1938 had killed 79 miners and seriously injured 40 others.

Closure of the mine

The mine closed in 1994. In 2013 the Walking Together sculpture by Stephen Broadbent was installed at the site of the former colliery. The walking trail of steel figures is a memorial to the 106 miners who died in mining disasters at Markham Colliery in 1937, 1938 and 1973. Each figure represents an individual dead miner whose name is stamped on the circular bronze tag on the figure's chest. By 2020, 88 figures had been installed with fundraising continuing to add figures of the remaining 18 miners.

References

External links
 List of miners killed in 1973
 Text of Calder, J (1974) Accident at Markham Colliery Derbyshire, transcribed but no figures.

1938 in England
1973 disasters in the United Kingdom
1973 in England
1938 mining disasters
1973 mining disasters
Disasters in Derbyshire
Coal mining disasters in England
Mining in Derbyshire
1930s in Derbyshire
1938 disasters in the United Kingdom
1970s in Derbyshire